Eriogonum nudum is a perennial shrub of the wild buckwheat genus which is known by the common name naked buckwheat or nude buckwheat.

Description
The Eriogonum nudum plant is a tall, bare, leafless stem, bifurcating into more stems, each topped with rounded clusters of white or pale pink or yellow flowers growing up to six feet from a basal rosette at the ground, where the flat green leaves are located. An striking characteristic is that flower clusters typically occur at the branch as well as the branch tips.  The naked stem gives the plant its common name.

Distribution
Naked buckwheat can be found scattered around the west coast of the United States. This species has one of the widest ecological distributions of all of the buckwheats. It can be found at wet coastal sea level locales and the coldest, driest elevations of the Sierra Nevada, as well as many areas in between.

The species is not uncommon, but some specific varieties are quite rare.

Butterflies
Nectar-feeding insects such as butterflies are attracted to buckwheat flowers. At least one butterfly subspecies (Apodemia mormo langei) uses naked buckwheat as its primary food source.

The complex of varieties and subspecies of naked buckwheat includes:

 Eriogonum nudum var. auriculatum - eared naked buckwheat
 Eriogonum nudum var. decurrens - Ben Lomond buckwheat
 Eriogonum nudum var. deductum
 Eriogonum nudum var. indictum - protruding buckwheat
 Eriogonum nudum var. murinum - mouse buckwheat
 Eriogonum nudum var. nudum 	
 Eriogonum nudum var. oblongifolium - oblong-leaved buckwheat
 Eriogonum nudum var. paralinum - Del Norte buckwheat
 Eriogonum nudum ssp. pauciflorum - few-flowered naked buckwheat
 Eriogonum nudum var. psychicola - Antioch Dunes buckwheat
 Eriogonum nudum var. pubiflorum - hairy-flowered buckwheat
 Eriogonum nudum var. regirivum - Kings River buckwheat
 Eriogonum nudum var. scapigerum
 Eriogonum nudum var. westonii - Weston's buckwheat
 Eriogonum nudum var. gramineu
 Eriogonum nudum ssp. saxicola

External links
Eriogonum nudum USDA info page
Jepson Flora Project entry
Phytologia v.89 no.3 (2007) pp 287

nudum
Flora of California
Flora of the Northwestern United States
Flora of the Western United States
Flora of the Sierra Nevada (United States)
Butterfly food plants
Flora without expected TNC conservation status